Tripiti may refer to:

 an archaeological site in Crete, see Tripiti (archaeological site)
 a village in Milos, see Trypiti
 a small village in Stagira-Akanthos municipality in Chalkidiki, Greece